The acronym CMSC may refer to:

 Canon Medical Systems Corporation
 Chamber Music Society of Colombo
 Chicago Metropolitan Ski Council, see Wilmot Mountain
 Chicago Motorsports Council
 Chittagong Model School and College
 Chittagong Mohammedan Sporting Club
 Christa McAuliffe Space Education Center, Pleasant Grove, Utah
 Clearwater Marine Science Center, see 
 Columbia Memorial Space Center, Downey, California